This is a list of public art in Caerphilly County Borough, a county borough in south Wales, that sits across the ancient county boundary between Glamorgan and Monmouthshire. It is governed by Caerphilly County Borough Council. This list applies only to works of public art on permanent display in an outdoor public space and does not, for example, include artworks in museums.

Aberbargoed

Bargoed

Bedwas

Blackwood

Brithdir

Caerphilly

Cwmcarn

Llanbradach

Machen

Nelson

Newbridge

New Tredegar

Oakdale

Pontllanfraith

Pontlottyn

Risca

Rhymney

Rudry

Senghenydd

Tir-Phil

Tir-y-berth

Troedrhiwfuwch

Ystrad Mynach

References

Caerphilly County Borough
Public art
British military memorials and cemeteries